Betta Home Living is an Australian independent retail franchise group selling home appliance and furniture. It is based in the Brisbane suburb of Eagle Farm and has stores across Australia. It is owned by the BSR Group.

History
In 1959, three local independent electrical retailers (Crystal Radio at East Brisbane, Hess & Ferguson at Wynnum and Laings Electrical at Red Hill) came together to combat rival electrical retail groups and formed the Brisbane Electrical Television Traders Association (BETTA). In 1961, by which time, there were seven independent members, the association was incorporated to form Betta Stores Pty Ltd. By 1964, when there were over 50 members Betta Stores Pty Ltd became a public company (Betta Stores Ltd), a business that serviced both Betta Electrical branded and non-branded independent retailers throughout the 1990s.

After BSL was placed into administration in late 2006, 48 of the Betta Stores acquired the registered brand and formed the BSR Group.

In 2013, Betta Electrical was rebranded as Betta Home Living.

Sponsorships
Betta Electrical was naming rights sponsor of several Supercars Championship teams; John Faulkner Racing from 1996 until 1998, Briggs Motor Sport / Triple Eight Race Engineering from 2002 until 2006 and Paul Weel Racing in 2003.

Betta Home Living has been a major partner of the Brisbane Heat cricket team since 2012.

References

External links
Official Website

Companies based in Brisbane
Consumer electronics retailers of Australia
Retail companies established in 1961
1961 establishments in Australia